Little Miss No-Account is a 1918 American silent comedy-drama film directed by William P. S. Earle and starring Gladys Leslie, Frank O'Connor, William Calhoun, Eulalie Jensen, and Wes Jenkins. It is based on the story The Reflection of Scarlet by Edward P. Smaney. The film was released by Vitagraph Company of America on April 13, 1918.

Plot

Cast
Gladys Leslie as Patty Baring
Frank O'Connor as Edwin Sayer
William Calhoun as Josiah Wheeler
Eulalie Jensen as Ann Wheeler-Ballinger
Wes Jenkins as Stebbins (as West Jenkins)
Richard Wangermann as Herman (as Richard Wangeman)
Carlton S. King as Ned (as Carlton King)
Stephen Carr as Bobby

Preservation
The film is now considered lost.

References

External links

1918 comedy-drama films
1918 films
American silent feature films
American black-and-white films
Vitagraph Studios films
Lost American films
1918 lost films
Films directed by William P. S. Earle
1910s American films
1910s English-language films
Silent American comedy-drama films